The Tehran Metro is a rapid transit system serving Tehran, the capital of Iran. It is the largest metro system in the Middle East. The system is owned and operated by Tehran Urban and Suburban Railway. It consists of six operational metro lines (and an additional commuter rail line), with construction under way on three lines including west extension of line 4, line 6 and north and east extension line 7.

The Tehran Metro carries more than 3 million passengers a day. In 2018, 820 million trips were made on Tehran Metro.

On all days of the week, the Metro service runs from approximately 05:30 to 23:00.

The line uses standard gauge and is mostly underground. Ticket price is 3,500 Iranian Toman for each journey (about US$0.05), regardless of the distance traveled, but using prepaid tickets costs much less. Seniors may travel for free on the metro. On all Tehran metro trains the first and half of the second carriages from each end are reserved for women. Women can still ride other cars freely.

History

Initial plans for the metro system were laid in late 1960s but could not be executed until 1982 due to socio-political issues such as the Iranian Revolution and the Iran-Iraq war. In 1970 the Plan and Budget Organization and the Municipality of Tehran announced an international tender for construction of a metro in Tehran. The French company SOFRETU, affiliated with the state-owned Paris transportation authority RATP, won the tender and in the same year began to conduct preliminary studies on the project. In 1974 a final report with a so-called "street-metro" proposal was tendered. The street-metro system recommended a road network with a loop express way in the central area and two highways for new urban areas and an 8-line metro network which were complemented by bus network and taxi services. Geological surveys commenced in 1976. In 1978 construction on the line was started in northern Tehran by the French company, however this development was short-lived with the advent of the Iranian Revolution and Iran–Iraq War in 1979 and 1980 respectively. SOFRETU ceased operations in Iran in December 1980. On March 3, 1982, the Iranian Cabinet ministers formally announced the stop of Tehran Metro operations by the French company.

In 1985, the "Tehran Metro Execution Plan" was re-approved by the Majles, the Iranian Parliament, on the basis of legal project of "Amendment of Law of Establishment of Tehran Urban and suburban Railway Company" which had been founded on Farvardin 1364 (April 1985). This was a literal continuation of exactly the same project that had been laid out before the revolution. Work proceeded slowly due to the continuing Iran–Iraq War and often ground to a halt. By the summer of 1985, urban pressure from the rapidly urbanising population, and lack of developed public transport system prompted the work to be resumed in earnest. "Line 1" (From Blvd. Shahid Ayatollah Haghani to City of Rey) and its extension to Behesht-e-Zahra Cemetery was made a priority. "Line 2" (From Dardasht in Tehran Pars district to Sadeghiyeh Second Square) and an extending towards the City of Karaj and Mehrshahr district was also made a secondary priority. Studies were also made to establish the previously designed Lines 3 & 4. It was decided that an organisation by the name of the Metro Company should be established in order to handle the future development of the system.

Following this phase, the Metro Company was managed by Asghar Ebrahimi Asl for eleven years. During this time, hundreds of millions of dollars were spent on the system and the Metro Company was given government concessions for the exploitation of iron ore mines in Bandar Abbas (Hormuzgan Province), exploitation and sale of Moghan Diotomite mine in the Iranian region of Azarbaijan, export of refinery residues from Isfahan oil refinery as well as tar from Isfahan steel mill. The year after Asghar Ebrahimi Asl left the management of the Metro Company and Mohsen Hashemi succeeded him, the first line of the Tehran Metro was launched between Tehran and Karaj.

Line 5 of the Tehran metro began operating in 1999 and was Iran's first metro system. The line was constructed by the Chinese company NORINCO.

From 2000 onwards, commercial operation began on Lines 1 and 2. The wagons on these lines are provided by CRV via CNTIC. The railway tracks and points on these lines are provided by the Austrian company Voestalpine.

The Metro uses equipment manufactured by a wide range of international companies: double-deck passenger cars for the Tehran-Karaj regional line are supplied by CRV (although some trains are from SEGC) via CNTIC and assembled by the Wagon Pars factory in Arak.

 approximately $2 billion has been spent on the Metro project. The Tehran Metro transports about 2.5 million passengers daily through its 7 operational lines (Lines 1,2,3,4,5,7,8). It also has additional one line under construction (Line 6), and an additional two lines in engineering phase. New 80 wagons have been added to the system in September 2012 to ease transportation and reduce rush-hour congestion. Iran is able to produce its need in wagons and trains independently.

A  branch line of Line 4 began running to Mehrabad International Airport on 15 March 2016. A  express line to Imam Khomeini International Airport was opened in August 2017.

Lines

Line 1

There are 32 stations along this line of which 24 stations are located underground and 8 above ground. , the total capacity of line 1 is 650,000 passenger per day, with trains stopping at each station for 20 seconds. The trains are each made up of seven wagons, with a nominal capacity of 1,300 seated and standing passengers.

Line 1 runs mostly north–south. A , three station extension of the line from Mirdamad station to Qolhak station opened on May 20, 2009. The , four stations second phase of this extension from Qolhak station to Tajrish Square was completed in 2011. Construction was to be completed by March 2007 but faced major issues due to large boulders and rock bed in part of the tunnels as well as water drainage issues. It has also faced major financing issues as the government has refused to release funds earmarked for the project to the municipality.

Since August 2017, one of Line 1's stations, Darvazeh Dowlat is open 24 hours a day, in order to accommodate passengers traveling to and from Imam Khomeini Airport via Line 1.

Line 1 connects Tehran to Imam Khomeini International Airport. Its first phase, to Shahr-e-Aftab station, opened in 2016, and the airport station opened in August 2017. It is the only metro line in Tehran that is completely open 24 hours a day (even if the frequency is only 80 minutes...), in order to accommodate passengers from late night and early morning flights (Line 1's Darvazeh Dowlat station is the only other metro station outside of Line 1 with that classification).

Line 2

This line opened between Sadeghieh and Imam Khomeini in February 2000. There are 22 stations along the line, of which Imam Khomeini Station was shared by Line 1. Line 2 is coloured blue on system maps and runs mostly east–west through the city.

The line was extended from Imam-Khomeini to Baharestan Metro Station in 2004, and to Shahid Madani, Sarsabz and Elm-o-Sanat University in March 2006 with the intermediate stations, Darvazeh Shemiran and Sabalan, opening in July 2006. It was extended further from Elm-o-Sanat University to Tehran Pars in February 2009, and to Farhangsara in June 2010. The extension phase to new east terminal is under construction.

Line 3

Line 3 travels from northeast to southwest. Line 3 is one of the most important lines as it connects southwest Tehran to northeast, crosses busy parts of the capital city, and can help to alleviate traffic problems.

Line 4

This line initially runs through Ekbatan (western Tehran) to Kolahdooz (eastern Tehran). The construction of a western extension to line 4 has been started in 2012 connecting Ekbatan to Chaharbagh Sq. This extension will include 3 stations. A sub-line of this line connects Bimeh station to Mehrabad Airport. This sub-line has 3 stations at Bimeh, Terminal 1&2 and Terminal 4&6.

Section 1, from Ferdowsi Square to Darvazeh Shemiran, opened in April 2008. Section 2 from Darvazeh shemiran to Shohada Square opened in February 2009. On May 24, 2009, Section 3 from Ferdowsi Square to Enghelab Square opened. On July 23, 2012 two more stations were inaugurated, connecting line 4 with line 5.

Currently there are 22 stations in operation on Line 4, coloured yellow on the system maps.

Line 5

Line 5 is coloured green on system maps; it is a  commuter rail line and has 12 stations. Entering the area of Karaj with main stations at Karaj and Golshahr and Hashtgerd. It connects with the western end of Line 2 at Tehran (Sadeghiyeh) station, and with the western end of Line 4 at Eram-e Sabz Metro Station.

Line 6

A tunnel boring machine (TBM) is used to construct the tunnel. TBM is using earth pressure balanced method to pass safely through urban areas without considerable settlement.

Line 7

This line, similar to line 6, and in contrast with line 3, goes from northwest to southeast and was constructed with modern TBM machines. This line has   with 19 stations right now.

Future Plans

Line 8

Line 9

Line 10
Line 10 stretching  with 35 stations is planned along the west–east corridor from Vardavard metro station in the west of Tehran towards the area of Kosar aqueduct in the east. Construction started in September 2020.

Line 11

Expansions of the current 7 Lines

Line 1 Northern Extension and Branch Extension

Line 2 Eastern Extension

Line 3 Branch

Line 4 Eastern and Western Extension

Line 4 Airport Branch Eastern Extension

Line 6 Southern Extension

Line 7 Northwestern Extension

LRT Lines 
3 LRT (Tram) lines are proposed along with the Metro lines.

Express Commuter Railway
3 other commuter Rail lines are planned along with Line 5(Tehran-Karaj-Hashtgerd Commuter Rail) bringing the total Metro Commuter Rails to 4 Lines .

Interchange stations
 1- Darvazeh Shemiran; Lines 2 & 4
 2- Shahid Beheshti; Lines 1 & 3
 3- Darvazeh Dowlat; Lines 1 & 4
 4- Imam Khomeini; Lines 1 & 2
 5- Theatr-e Shahr; Lines 3 & 4
 6- Shademan; Lines 2 & 4
 7- (Tehran) Sadeghiyeh; Lines 2 & 5
 8- Eram-e Sabz; Lines 4 & 5
 9- Shahed - Bagher Shahr; Lines 1 & 1
 10- Shahid Navvab-e Safavi; Lines 2 & 7
 11- Mahdiyeh; Lines 3 & 7
 12- Meydan-e Shohada; Lines 4 & 6 
 13- Meydan-e Mohammadiyeh; Lines 1 & 7 
 14- Imam Hossein; Lines 2 & 6
 15- Daneshgah-e Tarbiat Modares; Lines 6 & 7 
 16- Towhid; Lines 4 & 7 
 17- Shohada-ye Haftom-e Tir; Lines 1 & 6
 18- Meydan-e Vali Asr; Lines 3 & 6
 19- Shohada-ye Hefdah-e Shahrivar; Lines 6 & 7 (under construction on line 6, operational on line 7)
 20- Daneshgah-e Emam Ali; Lines 2 & 3 (operational on line 2, planned on line 3)
 21- Ayatollah Kashani; Lines 4 & 6 (under construction on line 4, under construction on line 6)

Network map

Safety 

All routes have been equipped with automatic train protection (ATP), automatic train stop (ATS), centralized traffic control (CTC), and SCADA. More and more residents use the metro due to the improvement in the peak-hour headways, the opening of more stations and overall improvement with new escalators, elevators, and air-conditioning in the trains.

On 18 July 2007, a twenty square metres area immediately adjacent to the entrance of the Toupkhaneh metro station caved in. There were no casualties, but the station had to undergo numerous repairs.
On 15 April 2012, safety walls of Mianrood River broke due to heavy rain in Tehran, and consequently, 300,000 cubic meters of water entered metro tunnel of Line 4. The two nearest stations were still under construction, so Metro operators had enough time to evacuate other stations from passengers. Nobody was killed, but water depth in the Habib-o-llah station, the deepest station on Line 4, was estimated to be near 18 meters. It took nearly two weeks to reopen the flooded stations which were previously in operation.

Challenges 
Tehran Metro has had various challenges during its operation since its start, the most recent of such has been their response to the COVID-19 pandemic.

COVID-19 pandemic in Iran 
Amidst the COVID-19 cases increasing in Iran, Tehran Metro made wearing masks a requirement to enter the metro network at any station. Law enforcement located in every station were ordered to prevent passengers from entering without masks and such passengers would be led to purchase masks from mask selling desks located at every metro station.

Complaints
The Cultural Heritage Organization of Iran has complained that the vibrations caused by the Metro were having a significant and highly adverse effect on the Masoudieh Palace in the Baharestan neighbourhood of central Tehran. The Cultural Heritage Organisation has also complained about vibrations near other historic sites such as the Golestan Palace and the National Museum of Iran.

Tickets 
Regular single table tickets

You can only use the subway once with this ticket. This ticket costs 12,000 Rials. If you plan to take a round trip, you need to get two single tickets.

Suburban single table tickets

This is the ticket from the 5th metro line that reaches Sadeghieh station from Karaj station. This ticket costs 12,000 Rials.

International Airport Single Ticket

This ticket is used for the subway line of Imam Khomeini Airport. This ticket costs 90,000 Rials.

Electronic ticket

You can use the subway as many times as you want by charging it. The cost of each of these e-cards is 30,000 Rials or 50,000 Rials and you can charge up to 500,000 Rials after purchase. You can charge your e-card using various booths and wall-mounted electronic charging devices at the bus and subway stations, either by cash or by bank credit card.

Tehran Metro Snapshot

Gallery

See also

References

External links

Tehran Metro (official site)  
The Unofficial Homepage of Iranian Railways
Video Clip of one of the Tehran Metro stations
Network map (to scale)
Tehran Metro Application for Android
Tehran Metro Application for badaOS
Tehran Metro Map PDF (in Persian)
 UrbanRail.Net – descriptions of all metro systems in the world, each with a schematic map showing all stations.

 
Underground rapid transit systems in Iran
1999 establishments in Iran
Standard gauge railways in Iran
Articles containing video clips
Railway lines opened in 1999